Union State Bank may refer to one of the following banks in the United States:

Union State Bank, Alabama 
Union State Bank, Florence, Texas, 1928
Union State Bank, Wisconsin